Piz Cavel is a mountain of the Lepontine Alps, situated between the Val Sumvitg and the Lumnezia in the canton of Graubünden. The closest locality is Vrin on the eastern side.

References

External links
 Piz Cavel on Hikr

Mountains of the Alps
Mountains of Switzerland
Mountains of Graubünden
Lepontine Alps
Two-thousanders of Switzerland
Lumnezia
Sumvitg